Carabus marietti inexpectatus is a subspecies of beetle from the family Carabidae that is endemic to Turkey.

References

marietti inexpectatus
Beetles described in 1986
Endemic fauna of Turkey
Insects of Turkey